George Thomas John Sotheron-Estcourt, 1st Baron Estcourt (21 January 1839 – 12 January 1915), known as George Bucknall-Estcourt until 1876 and as George Sotheron-Estcourt from 1876 to 1903, was a British Conservative Party politician.

Background
Estcourt was the son of Reverend Hilary Bucknall-Estcourt, son of Thomas Bucknall-Estcourt, Member of Parliament for Devizes and the University of Oxford, son of Thomas Grimston Estcourt, Member of Parliament for Cricklade. His mother was Anne Elizabeth, daughter of Sir John Lowther Johnstone, 6th Baronet, while Thomas Sotheron-Estcourt was his uncle. In 1876 he succeeded to the latter's estates and assumed by Royal licence the surname of Sotheron-Estcourt in lieu of his patronymic.

Political career
Estcourt sat as Member of Parliament for Wiltshire North from 1874 to 1885. In 1903 he was raised to the peerage as Baron Estcourt, of Estcourt in the Parish of Shipton Moyne in the County of Gloucester and of Darrington in the West Riding of the County of York.

Personal life
Lord Estcourt married Monica, daughter of Reverend Martin Stepylton, in 1863. They had no children. He died in January 1915, aged 75, when the barony became extinct. Lady Estcourt died in March 1922.

References

See also

1839 births
1915 deaths
Barons in the Peerage of the United Kingdom
Conservative Party (UK) MPs for English constituencies
UK MPs 1874–1880
UK MPs 1880–1885
UK MPs who were granted peerages
Peers created by Edward VII